Mikhail Vladimirovich Myasnikovich is a Belarusian politician who was Prime Minister of Belarus from 2010 to 2014. He has been the Chairman of the Board of the Eurasian Economic Commission since 2020.

Career
From 1972 to 1973, he served in the Soviet Army. From 1973 to 1983 Worked at the Minsk Water Supply and Water Treatment Plant, the Department of Public Utilities' Companies for the Minsk City Executive Committee.

From 1983 to 1984, he was a Chairman of the Executive Committee on the Soviet District Council of Minsk of People's Deputies, and from 1984 to 1985 was a deputy chairman of the Executive Committee of the Minsk City Council.

In 1985–1986, he was a secretary of the Minsk City Committee of the Communist Party of Belarus. From 1986 to 1991 worked at the Ministry of Housing and Public Utilities of the BSSR and the Committee for Economy and Planning of the BSSR.

In 1991–1994, he was a deputy prime minister, from 1995 to 2001 head of Administration in the President's Office (1995–2001) and chairman of the National Academy of Sciences (2001–2010).

In 2006, the United Civic Party re-published the list of 50 richest men in Belarus. Myasnikovich was among them with $296 million.

Prime Minister of Belarus
Myasinkovich was appointed by President Alexander Lukashenko to serve as Prime Minister of Belarus following the 2010 presidential election; he served until his sacking on 27 December 2014.

Personal life
Born in Novy Snov, Nesvizh Raion, Minsk Region, Byelorussian SSR, Soviet Union, he graduated from the Brest Engineering and Construction Institute in 1972 and the Communist Party School in 1989 in Minsk. He has a PhD in economics and has worked as an engineer in the construction industry. He also speaks English with his son, daughter and two grandchildren.

Notes

References 

1950 births
Living people
People from Nesvizh District
Prime Ministers of Belarus
Speakers of the Council of the Republic of Belarus
21st-century Belarusian politicians